From 1939 to 2019, 397 Venezuelan baseball players born in Venezuela have played in Major League Baseball. This list shows players who appeared in at least one game in MLB, including number indicating order of arrival, name of player, position, starting team, and dates of debut and final game.

Abbreviations for position
   P: Pitcher
   C: Catcher
1B: First baseman
2B: Second baseman
3B: Third baseman
SS: Shortstop
 IF: Infielder
OF: Outfielder
UTIL: Utility player
AL: American League
NL: National League

 Kervin Castro (born 1999), pitcher for the San Francisco Giants

Notes
Al Pedrique served as manager of the Arizona Diamondbacks during the 2004 season
Ozzie Guillén managed the Chicago White Sox from 2004–2011 and managed the Miami Marlins during the 2012 season.

See also

Baseball in Venezuela
Luis Aparicio Award
Venezuelan Baseball Hall of Fame and Museum
Venezuelan Professional Baseball League

 
 
Venezuela
+
Baseball players